Bruno Blašković (born 2 August 1998) is a Croatian swimmer. He represented Croatia at the 2019 World Aquatics Championships held in Gwangju, South Korea and he finished in 33rd place in the heats in the men's 50 metre freestyle event. In the men's 100 metre freestyle he finished in 27th place in the heats.

In 2015, he competed in the men's 50 metre freestyle and men's 100 metre freestyle events at the European Games held in Baku, Azerbaijan.

References 

Living people
1998 births
People from Vodnjan
Croatian male swimmers
Croatian male freestyle swimmers
Swimmers at the 2015 European Games
European Games competitors for Croatia
20th-century Croatian people
21st-century Croatian people